Diacylglycerol kinase beta is an enzyme that in humans is encoded by the DGKB gene.

Function 

Diacylglycerol kinases (DGKs) are regulators of the intracellular concentration of the second messenger diacylglycerol (DAG) and thus play a key role in cellular processes. Nine mammalian isotypes have been identified, which are encoded by separate genes. Mammalian DGK isozymes contain a conserved catalytic (kinase) domain and a cysteine-rich domain (CRD). The protein encoded by this gene is a diacylglycerol kinase, beta isotype. Two alternatively spliced transcript variants have been found for this gene.

References

Further reading 

 
 

EF-hand-containing proteins